The Rainforest Way is a circular series of tourist drives that extends through South East Queensland, Australia across the border into the Northern Rivers region of New South Wales.

It follows roughly the caldera of the extinct Tweed Volcano in the north east corner of NSW, whose volcanic plug is Mount Warning. The area contains many National Parks, of which several are classified as World Heritage Sites.  The drive features Gondwana Rainforests.

Major towns travelled through as part of the Rainforest Way include:
 Gold Coast
 Beaudesert
 Tweed Heads
 Byron Bay
 Lismore
 Ballina
 Casino
 Kyogle
 Murwillumbah

Smaller towns travelled through as part of the Rainforest Way include:
 Ocean Shores
 Brunswick Heads
 Mullumbimby
 Uki
 Bangalow
 Bogangar
 Nimbin
 Suffolk Park
 Lennox Head
 Alstonville
 Woodenbong
 Bonalbo
 Urbenville
 Burringbah

See also

External links
 Official site

References

Scenic routes in Australia
Roads in Queensland
Roads in New South Wales